JCH may refer to:
 Edith and Carl Marks Jewish Community House of Bensonhurst, in Brooklyn, NY
 James Cook railway station, in Middlesbrough, North Yorkshire, England
 Janet Clarke Hall, an Anglican residential college of the University of Melbourne
 Jaynes–Cummings–Hubbard model, in quantum optics
 Jersey Community Hospital, in Jerseyville, Illinois
 Journal of Contemporary History
 Jurong Community Hospital, in Jurong East, Singapore
 Qasigiannguit Heliport in Greenland